Paul Peter Cameron (12 June 1904 – 31 December 1978) was an Australian rules footballer who played with Carlton and South Melbourne in the Victorian Football League (VFL).

Cameron joined the Yarraville Football Club in 1929.

Cameron won the 1934 Gippsland Football League best and fairest award, the Trood Medal, when he was captain / coach of the Rosedale Football Club, after being recruited from Yarraville Football Club.

Cameron was then captain / coach of Berrigan Football Club in 1935 and 1936, leading them to the 1936 Murray Football League premiership.

Notes

External links 

Paul Cameron's profile at Blueseum

1904 births
1978 deaths
Carlton Football Club players
Sydney Swans players
Australian rules footballers from Melbourne
Australian rules football coaches
People from Essendon, Victoria